Elvis: A Legendary Performer Volume 3 is a compilation album featuring recordings by American singer Elvis Presley. It was the third in a series of albums that began with Elvis: A Legendary Performer Volume 1 in 1974, the first to be released since Presley's death in 1977, and the last edition until  Elvis: A Legendary Performer Volume 4 in 1983. Following the format of the series, the album was a mixture of previously released recordings and tracks that, as of the date of this album's release, had never been issued on an official RCA album release. It was certified Gold in December, 1978 by the RIAA.

Content
Included in this instalment of the Legendary Performer series is "Danny", a previously unissued recording from 1958 of what was at one point to be the theme song for Presley's film King Creole (when the film still retained the title of the novel upon which it was based, A Stone for Danny Fisher). "Britches", a song recorded for but dropped from the music-lite western Flaming Star makes its debut, as do two production number recordings cut from the 1968 NBC Comeback Special - remakes of Presley movie songs "It Hurts Me" and "Let Yourself Go". A previously unreleased live performance from Las Vegas in 1970, two alternate takes from movie soundtracks, and an alternate take from Presley's first post-Army single from 1960 round out the set, along with an interview recording from 1956 and several previously released numbers.

RCA issued two versions of this album: one in standard black vinyl, and another as a picture disc.

Track listing

*Parts of this interview were released as a promotional record in 1956

References

External links

Elvis Presley compilation albums
1979 compilation albums
RCA Records compilation albums
Compilation albums published posthumously